Franz Dübbers (April 8, 1908 – August 1987) was a German boxer who competed in the 1928 Summer Olympics.

He was born in Cologne. In 1924, 1927 and 1928 he was the German Flyweight Champion. In 1925 he was the German Bantamweight Champion and he placed second at the European Championships in Stockholm, Sweden.

In 1928 he was eliminated in the second round of the lightweight class in Amsterdam. He defeated Haakon Lind from Norway but then lost his fight to Pascual Bonfiglio from Argentina.

References

External links

Boxmuseum profile 

1908 births
1987 deaths
Sportspeople from Cologne
Lightweight boxers
Olympic boxers of Germany
Boxers at the 1928 Summer Olympics
German male boxers